Attorney General Myers may refer to:

Charles G. Myers (1810–1881), Attorney General of New York
Hardy Myers (1939–2016), Attorney General of Oregon

See also
General Myers (disambiguation)